The Venezuela International is an open international badminton tournament held in Venezuela. This tournament organized by the Venezuela Badminton Federation (Federación Venezolana de Badminton) and Badminton Pan Am.

Previous Winner

References 

Badminton tournaments
Badminton tournaments in Venezuela
Sports competitions in Venezuela